The 1979 World Table Tennis Championships were held in Pyongyang from April 25 to May 6, 1979.

Results

Team

Individual

References

External links
ITTF Museum

 
World Table Tennis Championships
World Table Tennis Championships
World Table Tennis Championships
International sports competitions hosted by North Korea
Sports competitions in Pyongyang
Table tennis competitions in North Korea
20th century in Pyongyang
April 1979 sports events in Asia
May 1979 sports events in Asia